The 1991–92 European Cup first round was the first stage of the 1991–92 European Cup competition, and featured 32 teams entering the competition. It began on 17 September with the first legs and ended on 2 October 1991 with the second legs. The 16 winners advanced to the second round.

Times are CET/CEST, as listed by UEFA.

Format
Each tie was played over two legs, with each team playing one leg at home. The team that scored more goals on aggregate over the two legs advanced to the next round. If the aggregate score was level, the away goals rule was applied, i.e. the team that scored more goals away from home over the two legs advanced. If away goals were also equal, then extra time was played. The away goals rule would be again applied after extra time, i.e. if there were goals scored during extra time and the aggregate score was still level, the visiting team advanced by virtue of more away goals scored. If no goals were scored during extra time, the tie was decided by penalty shoot-out.

Draw
The draw for the first round was held on 11 July 1991 in Geneva, Switzerland.

Summary

The first legs were played on 17 and 18 September, and the second legs on 2 October 1991.

|}

Matches

Barcelona won 3–1 on aggregate.

Kaiserslautern won 3–1 on aggregate.

Marseille won 10–0 on aggregate.

2–2 on aggregate; Sparta Prague won on away goals.

Benfica won 10–0 on aggregate.

Arsenal won 6–2 on aggregate.

Dynamo Kyiv won 4–0 on aggregate.

Brøndby won 4–2 on aggregate.

2–2 on aggregate; Panathinaikos won on away goals.

1–1 on aggregate; IFK Göteborg won on away goals.

PSV Eindhoven won 3–2 on aggregate.

Anderlecht won 4–1 on aggregate.

Red Star Belgrade won 8–0 on aggregate.

Apollon Limassol won 3–2 on aggregate.

Kispest Honvéd won 3–1 on aggregate.

Sampdoria won 7–1 on aggregate.

Notes

References

External links

First round
September 1991 sports events in Europe
October 1991 sports events in Europe